Strömpilen is a shopping centre in Umeå, Sweden. It is located next to the Ume River.

External links
Strömpilen
Busplaneten

Shopping centres in Sweden
Umeå
Buildings and structures in Västerbotten County